This is the discography of English songwriter & producer Jamie Scott.

Songwriting

Production

Singles 

 2004 "Just"
 2005 "Searching"
 2007 "When Will I See Your Face Again"
 2008 "Standing in the Rain"
2015 "Unbreakable"
2015 "My Hurricane"
 2017 "So Far Away" (Martin Garrix and David Guetta featuring Jamie Scott and Romy Dya)
2020 "Friendly Fire"
2020 "Emily"
2020 "This Time Lucky"
2020 "New York Nights"

Albums

Solo 
{{tracklist
| collapsed       = yes
| headline        = 2005: Soul Searching (unreleased)
| title1          = Searching
| note1           = 
| length1         = X:XX
| title2          = Love Song To Remember
| length2         = X:XX
| title3          = Just
| note3           = 
| length3         = X:XX
| title4          = Hooks in Me
| note4           = 
| length4         = X:XX
| title5          = Shameful
| note5           = 
| length5         = X:XX
| title6          = Best of Me
| note6           = 
| length6         = X:XX
| title7          = Soul
| note7           = 
| length7         = X:XX
| title8          = 45
| note8           = 
| length8         = X:XX
| title9          = River
| note9           = 
| length9         = X:XX
| title10          = Everything Woman
| note10           = 
| length10         = X:XX
| title11          = Troubled Mind
| note11           = 
| length11         = X:XX

|all_writing=|title12=|length12=|title13=|length13=|title14=|length14=|title15=|length15=|title16=|length16=|title17=|length17=|title18=|length18=|title19=|length19=|title20=|length20=|total_length=}}2020: How Still The River'''''

Jamie Scott and The Town

Graffiti6

References 

Discographies of British artists
Alternative rock discographies
Pop music discographies